The 2020 Southside Flyers season is the 29th season for the franchise in the Women's National Basketball League (WNBL). With a grand final win over the Townsville Fire, the Flyers took home their fourth championship title. This win marked their first title since rebranding.

Due to the COVID-19 pandemic, a North Queensland hub is set to host the season. The season was originally 2020–21 and would be traditionally played over several months across the summer, however this seasons scheduling has been condensed. The six-week season will see Townsville, Cairns and Mackay host a 52-game regular season fixture, plus a four game final series (2 x semi-finals, preliminary final and grand final).

Roster

Standings

Results

Regular season

Finals

References

External links
Southside Flyers Official website

2020 WNBL season
WNBL seasons by team
Basketball,Southside Flyers
2020 in basketball
Australia,Southside Flyers
2020–21 in Australian basketball